James, Jim or Jimmy Morrissey may refer to:
 James Morrissey (PR consultant), Irish public relations consultant
 James Morrissey (footballer), Australian rules footballer
 James P. Morrissey, president of Santa Clara University
 Jim Morrissey (American football), American football linebacker
 Jim Morrissey (politician), member of the California State Assembly
 Jim Morrissey (hurler), Irish hurler
 Jimmy Morrissey, American football center